The King of Fighters Neowave (KOF Neowave, or KOF NW) is a 2D fighting game produced by SNK Playmore and released as a coin-operated arcade game for Sammys Atomiswave hardware in 2004. It was the first game SNK Playmore produced for the Atomiswave. An offshoot of The King of Fighters series, it is not counted in the main series numbering. The game was also made on the PlayStation 2 and Xbox. The PS2 version was released only in Japan and the PAL region, the Xbox version was released both in Japan and North America. The North American version was released on April 18, 2006. In 2020, a Dreamcast homebrew adaptation of the arcade version was also made possible due to the Dreamcast sharing almost identical hardware with its Atomiswave cousin. The character artwork was done by Tomokazu Nakano (of Power Instinct fame). In Japan, it was the last game to be released for the Xbox.

Gameplay
The game reverts to the 3-character elimination system from KOF '94 to KOF '98, ignoring gameplay features from later games such as the "Striker" system used from KOF '99 through KOF 2001 and tag team system in KOF 2003. The PlayStation 2 and XBOX versions of the games graphics consist of polygonal 3D backgrounds overlaid with 2D character sprites (similar to the 3D stages featured in the console versions of previous games in the series such as the Dreamcast versions of KOF '98 and KOF '99), whereas the Arcade version has 2D backgrounds.

With the change of hardware from Neo Geo to Atomiswave, the number of buttons is now increased to five. In addition to the standard four attack buttons used in the previous games, a fifth button is now added which is used to activate the Heat Mode. Heat Mode will cause the character to blink red and increase their offensive strength, with the side effect being that the character's health will begin to drain. The player will return to normal after getting hit by the opponent or by pressing Heat Mode button again to deactivate it, and the player must wait until you lose a round to activate it again. The player cannot use Heat Mode when the life gauge is low.

The player can select their own playing style similar to KOF '97 and KOF '98, from three different styles, which affects the techniques available to the player and the length of their Power Gauge.

In Super Cancel Mode (SC Mode), the player has a three stock Power Gauge. The player can use Super Special Moves (which requires one Power Gauge stock) and MAX Super Special Moves (which requires two). With one Power stock, the player can cancel a regular move into a Special or Super Special move, and a regular Special into a Super Special. The player can also use one Power stock to cancel a guard into a Knockdown Blow or an Emergency Escape, or do a Quick Emergency Escape during a normal or command move.

In Guard Break Mode (GB Mode), the player has a two stock Power Gauge. Like in SC Mode, the player can perform Super Special (one stock) and MAX Super Special Moves (two stock). The player can parry an opponent's attack using the "Just Defend" technique, guarding against an opponent's attacks at the precise moment it makes contact with the character, allowing the player to follow it up with a counterattack. Using one Power stock, the player can guard cancel into an Emergency Escape or do a Quick Emergency Escape. The player can also perform a Guard Break attack with one Power stock, which is an unblockable version of a character's Knockdown Attack.

In MAX2 Mode (M2 Mode), the player has a single stock Power Gauge. The player can perform Super Special Moves with one stock, as well as MAX Super Special Moves. However, MAX moves can only be performed when the player has 25% or less of their life gauge remaining. Additionally, an exclusive MAX2 move can be performed under these conditions as well. In M2 Mode, the player can guard cancel into a Knockdown Attack.

Characters

Like KOF '98 and KOF 2002, Neowave has no actual storyline, but is instead a "Dream Match" which gathers numerous characters from various past KOF games, regardless of their status in the overarching storyline. The character roster of the arcade version is similar to the Neo Geo version of KOF 2002, with a few differences in the team placement. The KOF 2000 Team and the KOF 2001 Team are eliminated from the lineup, and a Mixed Team is introduced, composed of Saisyu Kusanagi, Kula Diamond, and Shingo Yabuki. King replaces May Lee in the Women Fighters Team, while Jhun Hoon replaces Kim Kaphwan in the Korean Team. Kim, along with Vanessa and Ramón, are still featured in the arcade version as hidden characters, along with the Orochi versions of the Orochi Team. Geese Howard appears in the game as the main boss character, with this incarnation of the character being based on his younger self from Art of Fighting 2.

The PlayStation 2 version of the game brings back five characters from KOF 2002: Seth, May Lee, Angel, the Kusanagi clone, and Omega Rugal (with K9999 being the only character from KOF 2002 missing in this version). The Xbox version, due to licensing issues with Eolith, includes all the characters from the PS2 version with the exception of Ángel and May Lee.

Japan Team:
Kyo Kusanagi
Benimaru Nikaido
Goro Daimon

K′ Team:
K'
Maxima
Whip

Iori Team:
Iori Yagami
Mature
Vice

Orochi Team / Awakened Orochi Team:
Yashiro Nanakase / Orochi Yashiro
Shermie / Orochi Shermie
Chris / Orochi Chris

Fatal Fury Team:
Terry Bogard
Andy Bogard
Joe Higashi

Psycho Soldier Team:
Athena Asamiya
Sie Kensou
Chin Gentsai
Outlaw Team AKA 97 Special Team:
Ryuji Yamazaki
Blue Mary
Billy Kane

Art of Fighting Team:
Ryo Sakazaki
Robert Garcia
Takuma Sakazaki

Ikari Team:
Leona
Ralf Jones
Clark Still 

Rival Team:
Kula Diamond
Saisyu Kusanagi
Shingo Yabuki

Korea Team:
Jhun Hoon
Choi Bounge
Chang Koehan

Women Fighters Team:
Mai Shiranui
Yuri Sakazaki
King

Single Hidden characters:

All versions
Vanessa
Kim Kaphwan
Ramón

Console versions additions
May Lee (PS2 version only)
Ángel (PS2 version only)
Seth
Kusanagi
Omega Rugal

Boss
Geese Howard (based on the younger version from Art of Fighting 2)

Development
By the mid-2000s, SNK's in-house Neo-Geo hardware had become quite dated. After The King of Fighters 2003, SNK Playmore looked for newer substitute platforms for future development. The Atomiswave, a cartridge-based multi-arcade system like the Neo-Geo and based on Sega's Dreamcast hardware, with which SNK was already familiar, was an obvious candidate. Rather than commit a new major game blindly, SNK instead chose to "test the waters" with a remix of The King of Fighters 2002, tweaking the game's systems; reskinning the game with high-resolution backgrounds, character art, and interface elements to take advantage of the more advanced hardware; and removing characters originating with the Eolith-developed KOF2001 and KOF2002, replacing them with other SNK-originated characters.

Reception

The King of Fighters: Neowave met with mixed reviews upon release. Reviewers noted the updated graphics and traditionally solid mechanics, and were pleased with online play in the console versions. They also commented on the game's drab presentation and overly familiar design. Charles Onyett wrote for IGN, "Sure it's got updated graphics, a few different styles of play, and a huge roster of fighters, but it does little to entice any non-KoF fans into the mix, something this genre desperately needs." For GameSpot, Greg Casavin wrote that the game "still packs some good stuff for hardcore fans, but the touched-up paint job doesn't make this feel like a whole new game. In fact, in some ways it feels like a step backward from The King of Fighters 2002."

Notes

References

External links

2004 video games
2D fighting games
Arcade video games
SNK Playmore games
The King of Fighters games
Fighting games
PlayStation 2 games
PlayStation Network games
Xbox games
Fighting games used at the Super Battle Opera tournament
Video games developed in Japan
Video games set in New York City
Video games set in Indonesia
UTV Ignition Games games
Multiplayer and single-player video games